The 2015 State of Origin series was the 34th time the annual best-of-three series between the Queensland and New South Wales rugby league teams to be played entirely under 'state of origin' rules (1980 and 1981 were only one game series). It was the third series to be administered by the Australian Rugby League Commission which was created in a major restructure of the sport's administration in Australia.

This series had one game played in each of Sydney, Melbourne and Brisbane, with Game I played at the 83,500 capacity ANZ Stadium, Game II played at the 100,024 capacity Melbourne Cricket Ground, and Game III played at the 52,500 capacity Suncorp Stadium.

Former Canberra, Queensland and Australian captain Mal Meninga was coach of the Queensland side, whose eight-year State of Origin series winning streak was ended by New South Wales in 2014. The Blues were coached by former Canberra, NSW and Australia captain Laurie Daley for a third consecutive year.

Game I

National Anthem: Josh Piterman

Game II

National Anthem: Claire Lyon

Game III

National Anthem: Australian Girls Choir and Danielle de Niese

Corey Parker was awarded the Wally Lewis medal for player of the series.

Teams
The 18th, 19th & 20th man are reserves to cover for any forthcoming injuries to the selected squad and, unless chosen, do not actually play.

New South Wales Blues

1 - Gallen retained the captaincy role from Farah in Game II.

2 - Robbie Farah was originally chosen to play in Game lll but withdrew due to a hand injury, he was replaced by Michael Ennis on game day.

Queensland Maroons

1 - Daly Cherry-Evans was originally selected to play in game one but withdrew due to injury. He was replaced by Michael Morgan, then Morgan retained his spot on the bench in Game II and III.

Residents

Under-20s

Women's Interstate Challenge

Records
Game II achieved the highest ever attendance for a State of Origin Game, with a crowd of 91,513 people in attendance.

Game III saw numerous records broken:
Game III achieved the highest ever attendance for a match at Suncorp Stadium, with a crowd of 52,500 people in attendance.
Queensland captain Cameron Smith made his 36th Queensland appearance, drawing level with Darren Lockyer for most appearances for Queensland.
Johnathan Thurston scored 18 points, equalling Lote Tuqiri's for most points in a single match by a Queenslander. In addition, Thurston kicked 9 goals from 9 attempts, an Origin record.
With a 52-6 victory, Queensland equaled their record for highest State of Origin score, and broke the record for largest winning margin in State of Origin history, with a 46-point winning margin.

References

State of Origin series
State of Origin series